The Circle Social Chart, formerly the Gaon Social Chart, part of Circle Chart, is a weekly chart that ranks the top 50 most-popular South Korean musical artists according to data collected from the digital platforms YouTube, TikTok, Mubeat, and MyCelebs.

Launched in July 2013 by the Korea Music Content Association (KMCA), the chart originally ranked the top 100 South Korean songs according to their worldwide popularity on social networking sites. From July 15, 2013 to June 22, 2014, data was taken from YouTube, Twitter, Facebook and Me2day. After Me2day closed, data was taken from YouTube, Twitter, and Facebook. In July 2014, in conjunction with the launch of the Gaon Weibo Chart—a joint venture between Gaon and Sina—Facebook was replaced by Weibo. YinYueTai was added to the chart's metrics in February 2016, effective the week eight issue. Weibo was removed in July 2017 after its data partnership with Gaon ended. The final issue published of the song-oriented version of the chart was the week 27 issue, for the period dated June 30–July 6, 2019. "Boy with Luv" by BTS was the number-one song at that time. "TT" by Twice was the longest-running number-one for the chart's duration, with a collective total of 16 non-consecutive weeks. 

On July 17, 2019, Gaon published notice of the Social Chart's reorganization into an artist-oriented chart on its website. The KMCA announced the changeover to the Social Chart 2.0 on the 19th. Data would now be aggregated from V Live, Mubeat, SMR, and MyCelebs going forward, with YouTube to be added later on in the year. The video platform's official inclusion in the Social chart's metrics was announced in February 2020. Data was retroactively integrated into past chart issues beginning from the first week of January. BTS was the first artist to rank at number one on the new chart. A new data partnership with TikTok was announced on May 10, 2021. The platform was integrated into the chart's metrics beginning June 1, and its inclusion was reflected in the week 23 issue released on June 10 for the period May 30–June 5, 2021. V Live was removed from the chart's metrics effective January 1, 2022—notice was posted on January 3—and this was reflected in the first issue of the year, for the week that began on December 26, 2021. Following a complete rebrand by the KMCA in July 2022, it was renamed the Circle Social Chart.

The act that spends the most weeks at number one on the chart is awarded the Social Hot Star of the Year award at the annual Gaon Chart Music Awards. BTS was the inaugural recipient, at the 2019 ceremony, and remains the artist with the most weeks at number one overall on the chart.

Number-one songs 
While this version of the Social chart went defunct by the end of June 2019, archives of all past issues were still accessible on the Gaon website via the original url. Following the rebrand in July 2022, which included an update of all urls, the old song chart url is no longer live and no archives are available on the new Circle Chart website.

Number-one artists

Songs with the most weeks at number one
Where multiple songs share the same ranking, entries are listed oldest to newest.

Artists with the most weeks at number one

See also
 Billboard Social 50

Notes

References

External links
 Social Chart at Circle Chart

South Korean record charts